The 1958 season was Cherno More's second consecutive season in A Group after the dramatic survival in 1957. The club competed as Botev Varna. The Republican Section for Football, having decided in favor of reorganizing the league to a fall-to-spring cycle, halted the season on 6 July 1958 with the teams having played each other once. League leaders CDNA were declared champions and no teams were relegated.

Republican Football Group A

Matches

League standings

Results summary

References

External links
 http://www.retro-football.bg/?q=bg/1958
 https://bulgarian-football.com/archive/1958/a-grupa.html
 http://a-pfg.com/%D1%81%D0%B5%D0%B7%D0%BE%D0%BD/1958/

PFC Cherno More Varna seasons
Cherno More Varna